The Colorado Rockies' 2002 season was the tenth for the Rockies. They tried to win the National League West. Buddy Bell and Clint Hurdle were the managers, the latter replacing the former after the former was fired 22 games into the season. Hurdle won 67 out of 140 games and was kept on as manager for the following season. They played home games at Coors Field. They finished with a record of 73-89, 4th in the NL West.

Offseason
December 16, 2001: Jeff Cirillo was traded by the Colorado Rockies to the Seattle Mariners for Brian Fuentes, Denny Stark, and José Paniagua.
January 7, 2002: Mike Myers was traded by the Colorado Rockies to the Arizona Diamondbacks for J.D. Closser and Jack Cust.
January 11, 2002: Todd Jones was signed as a free agent by the Colorado Rockies.
January 21, 2002: Ross Gload was traded by the Colorado Rockies with Craig House to the New York Mets for Todd Zeile, Benny Agbayani, and cash.
January 26, 2002: Ross Gload was purchased by the Colorado Rockies from the New York Mets.
February 7, 2002: Kent Mercker was signed as a free agent by the Colorado Rockies.
March 31, 2002: Bobby Estalella was signed as a free agent by the Colorado Rockies.

Regular season

Season standings

National League West

Record vs. opponents

Notable transactions
June 4, 2002: Jeff Francis was drafted by the Colorado Rockies in the 1st round of the 2002 amateur draft. Player signed June 19, 2002.
July 29, 2002: Sandy Alomar Jr. was traded by the Chicago White Sox to the Colorado Rockies for Enemencio Pacheco (minors).
July 31, 2002: Todd Hollandsworth was traded by the Colorado Rockies with Dennys Reyes to the Texas Rangers for Gabe Kapler, Jason Romano and cash.
July 31, 2002: John Thomson was traded by the Colorado Rockies with Mark Little to the New York Mets for Jay Payton, Mark Corey, and Robert Stratton (minors).

Major League debuts
Pitchers:
Aaron Cook (Aug 10)
Cory Vance (Sep 21)

Roster

Game log 

|-  style="text-align:center; background:#fbb;"
| 1 || April 1 || @ Cardinals || 10–2 || Morris (1–0) || Hampton (0–1) || || 48,397 || 0–1
|-  style="text-align:center; background:#bfb;"
| 2 || April 3 || @ Cardinals || 6–3 || Neagle (1–0) || Stephenson (0–1) || Jiménez (1) || 26,557 || 1–1
|-  style="text-align:center; background:#bfb;"
| 3 || April 4 || @ Cardinals || 6–1 || Thomson (1–0) || Benes (0–1) || || 27,691 || 2–1
|-  style="text-align:center; background:#fbb;"
| 4 || April 5 || @ Dodgers || 9–0 || Ashby (1–0) || Chacón (0–1) || || 25,091 || 2–2
|-  style="text-align:center; background:#fbb;"
| 5 || April 6 || @ Dodgers || 9–2 || Ishii (1–0) || Jennings (0–1) || || 38,693 || 2–3
|-  style="text-align:center; background:#fbb;"
| 6 || April 7 || @ Dodgers || 6–4 || Brown (1–1) || Hampton (0–2) || Gagné (1) || 28,452 || 2–4
|-  style="text-align:center; background:#fbb;"
| 7 || April 8 || Astros || 8–4 || Oswalt (2–0) || Neagle (1–1) || || 50,392 || 2–5
|-  style="text-align:center; background:#bfb;"
| 8 || April 9 || Astros || 10–5 || Thomson (2–0) || Reynolds (1–1) || || 30,153 || 3–5
|-  style="text-align:center; background:#bfb;"
| 9 || April 10 || Astros || 4–1 || Chacón (1–1) || Mlicki (0–2) || Jiménez (2) || 29,552 || 4–5
|-  style="text-align:center; background:#fbb;"
| 10 || April 11 || Diamondbacks || 8–4 || Johnson (3–0) || Reyes (0–1) || || 31,714 || 4–6
|-  style="text-align:center; background:#fbb;"
| 11 || April 12 || Diamondbacks || 8–3 || Schilling (3–0) || Hampton (0–3) || || 40,832 || 4–7
|-  style="text-align:center; background:#fbb;"
| 12 || April 13 || Diamondbacks || 7–5 (10) || Myers (1–1) || Jiménez (0–1) || || 42,596 || 4–8
|-  style="text-align:center; background:#fbb;"
| 13 || April 14 || Diamondbacks || 6–3 || Batista (1–0) || Thomson (2–1) || Kim (2) || 42,298 || 4–9
|-  style="text-align:center; background:#fbb;"
| 14 || April 15 || Dodgers || 5–2 || Pérez (1–1) || Chacón (1–2) || || 29,763 || 4–10
|-  style="text-align:center; background:#bfb;"
| 15 || April 16 || Dodgers || 6–4 || Jennings (1–1) || Ashby (1–1) || Jiménez (3) || 30,354 || 5–10
|-  style="text-align:center; background:#fbb;"
| 16 || April 17 || Dodgers || 6–3 || Ishii (3–0) || White (0–1) || Gagné (5) || 32,878 || 5–11
|-  style="text-align:center; background:#bfb;"
| 17 || April 19 || @ Diamondbacks || 8–6 || Neagle (2–1) || Anderson (0–2) || Jiménez (4) || 37,443 || 6–11
|-  style="text-align:center; background:#fbb;"
| 18 || April 20 || @ Diamondbacks || 9–8 || Helling (2–2) || Thomson (2–2) || Myers (2) || 47,627 || 6–12
|-  style="text-align:center; background:#fbb;"
| 19 || April 21 || @ Diamondbacks || 7–1 || Johnson (5–0) || Chacón (1–3) || || 43,891 || 6–13
|-  style="text-align:center; background:#fbb;"
| 20 || April 23 || @ Reds || 3–2 || Haynes (2–2) || Jennings (1–2) || Graves (7) || 14,518 || 6–14
|-  style="text-align:center; background:#fbb;"
| 21 || April 24 || @ Reds || 4–3 || Williamson (1–0) || Jiménez (0–2) || || 13,004 || 6–15
|-  style="text-align:center; background:#fbb;"
| 22 || April 25 || @ Reds || 4–3 || Sullivan (2–0) || White (0–2) || Graves (8) || 14,416 || 6–16
|-  style="text-align:center; background:#bfb;"
| 23 || April 26 || Phillies || 4–1 || Thomson (3–2) || Adams (0–3) || Jiménez (5) || 37,551 || 7–16
|-  style="text-align:center; background:#bfb;"
| 24 || April 27 || Phillies || 8–6 || Chacón (2–3) || Duckworth (1–2) || Jiménez (6) || 38,064 || 8–16
|-  style="text-align:center; background:#bfb;"
| 25 || April 28 || Phillies || 4–2 || Jennings (2–2) || Wolf (1–1) || Jiménez (7) || 40,357 || 9–16
|-  style="text-align:center; background:#bfb;"
| 26 || April 30 || Pirates || 10–0 || Hampton (1–3) || Williams (2–3) || || 30,759 || 10–16
|-

|-  style="text-align:center; background:#bfb;"
| 27 || May 1 || Pirates || 6–0 || Neagle (3–1) || Fogg (3–1) || || 29,529 || 11–16
|-  style="text-align:center; background:#bfb;"
| 28 || May 2 || Pirates || 7–2 || Thomson (4–2) || Villone (2–4) || || 30,134 || 12–16
|-  style="text-align:center; background:#fbb;"
| 29 || May 3 || @ Phillies || 3–2 || Duckworth (2–2) || Chacón (2–4) || Mesa (7) || 15,257 || 12–17
|-  style="text-align:center; background:#fbb;"
| 30 || May 4 || @ Phillies || 6–5 || Mercado (1–0) || White (0–3) || Mesa (8) || 16,205 || 12–18
|-  style="text-align:center; background:#fbb;"
| 31 || May 5 || @ Phillies || 7–4 || Padilla (4–2) || Hampton (1–4) || Mesa (9) || 32,411 || 12–19
|-  style="text-align:center; background:#bfb;"
| 32 || May 7 || @ Expos || 5–3 || Thomson (5–2) || Armas (4–3) || Jiménez (8) || 3,780 || 13–19
|-  style="text-align:center; background:#bfb;"
| 33 || May 8 || @ Expos || 5–0 || Chacón (3–4) || Pavano (2–4) || || 5,220 || 14–19
|-  style="text-align:center; background:#fbb;"
| 34 || May 9 || @ Expos || 6–5 (12) || Lloyd (1–2) || White (0–4) || || 3,183 || 14–20
|-  style="text-align:center; background:#bbfbbb;"
| 35 || May 10 || @ Mets || 9–5 || Jennings (3–2) || D'Amico (2–3) || || 37,484 || 15–20
|-  style="text-align:center; background:#fbb;"
| 36 || May 11 || @ Mets || 4–3 || Leiter (4–2) || Hampton (1–5) || Strickland (1) || 41,605 || 15–21
|-  style="text-align:center; background:#bfb;"
| 37 || May 12 || @ Mets || 4–3 (13) || White (1–4) || Davis (1–1) || Jiménez (9) || 33,578 || 16–21
|-  style="text-align:center; background:#bfb;"
| 38 || May 13 || Marlins || 7–3 || Stark (1–0) || Penny (3–2) || || 29,971 || 17–21
|-  style="text-align:center; background:#fbb;"
| 39 || May 14 || Marlins || 6–2 || Beckett (1–2) || Neagle (3–2) || Núñez (8) || 28,651 || 17–22
|-  style="text-align:center; background:#bfb;"
| 40 || May 15 || Marlins || 7–2 || Jennings (4–2) || Burnett (5–3) || || 27,898 || 18–22
|-  style="text-align:center; background:#bfb;"
| 41 || May 16 || Marlins || 10–3 || Hampton (2–5) || Tavárez (1–3) || || 28,197 || 19–22
|-  style="text-align:center; background:#fbb;"
| 42 || May 17 || Braves || 4–2 || Glavine (6–2) || Thomson (5–3) || Smoltz (12) || 40,357 || 19–23
|-  style="text-align:center; background:#bfb;"
| 43 || May 18 || Braves || 7–3 || Stark (2–0) || Millwood (2–5) || || 42,780 || 20–23
|-  style="text-align:center; background:#fbb;"
| 44 || May 19 || Braves || 2–1 || Remlinger (2–0) || Nichting (0–1) || Smoltz (13) || 43,151 || 20–24
|-  style="text-align:center; background:#bfb;"
| 45 || May 21 || Padres || 7–6 || Speier (1–0) || Embree (3–2) || Jiménez (10) || 30,616 || 21–24
|-  style="text-align:center; background:#bfb;"
| 46 || May 22 || Padres || 5–3 || Mercker (1–0) || Fikac (3–3) || Jiménez (11) || 29,204 || 22–24
|-  style="text-align:center; background:#bfb;"
| 47 || May 23 || Padres || 16–3 || Thomson (6–3) || Tomko (3–4) || || 30,701 || 23–24
|-  style="text-align:center; background:#bfb;"
| 48 || May 24 || Giants || 8–5 || Stark (3–0) || Ortiz (4–3) || Jiménez (12) || 37,627 || 24–24
|-  style="text-align:center; background:#bfb;"
| 49 || May 25 || Giants || 6–3 || Nichting (1–1) || Rueter (6–2) || Jiménez (13) || 41,957 || 25–24
|-  style="text-align:center; background:#bfb;"
| 50 || May 26 || Giants || 10–6 || Jennings (5–2) || Jensen (4–4) || || 48,073 || 26–24
|-  style="text-align:center; background:#fbb;"
| 51 || May 27 || @ Padres || 8–5 || Lawrence (5–3) || Hampton (2–6) || Hoffman (14) || 15,666 || 26–25
|-  style="text-align:center; background:#bfb;"
| 52 || May 28 || @ Padres || 3–2 (12) || Jiménez (1–2) || Fikac (3–4) || Speier (1) || 13,998 || 27–25
|-  style="text-align:center; background:#fbb;"
| 53 || May 29 || @ Padres || 11–3 || Middlebrook (1–1) || Stark (3–1) || || 13,421 || 27–26
|-  style="text-align:center; background:#bfb;"
| 54 || May 30 || @ Padres || 4–2 || Neagle (4–2) || Jones (3–3) || Jiménez (14) || 18,755 || 28–26
|-  style="text-align:center; background:#bfb;"
| 55 || May 31 || @ Giants || 6–2 || Jennings (6–2) || Jensen (4–5) || Jones (1) || 38,337 || 29–26
|-

|-  style="text-align:center; background:#bfb;"
| 56 || June 1 || @ Giants || 5–4 || Hampton (3–6) || Hernández (5–5) || Jiménez (15) || 40,893 || 30–26
|-  style="text-align:center; background:#fbb;"
| 57 || June 2 || @ Giants || 9–2 || Schmidt (1–1) || Thomson (6–4) || || 40,651 || 30–27
|-  style="text-align:center; background:#fbb;"
| 58 || June 3 || Dodgers || 11–5 || Mota (1–0) || Jiménez (1–3) || || 30,150 || 30–28
|-  style="text-align:center; background:#fbb;"
| 59 || June 4 || Dodgers || 10–4 || Orosco (1–1) || Jones (0–1) || || 30,195 || 30–29
|-  style="text-align:center; background:#bfb;"
| 60 || June 5 || Dodgers || 8–6 || Jennings (7–2) || Daal (4–2) || Jiménez (16) || 31,793 || 31–29
|-  style="text-align:center; background:#fbb;"
| 61 || June 7 || @ Blue Jays || 8–0 || Halladay (7–2) || Hampton (3–7) || || 20,032 || 31–30
|-  style="text-align:center; background:#fbb;"
| 62 || June 8 || @ Blue Jays || 3–1 || Walker (2–0) || Thomson (6–5) || Escobar (12) || 21,298 || 31–31
|-  style="text-align:center; background:#fbb;"
| 63 || June 9 || @ Blue Jays || 3–2 || Escobar (3–2) || Jiménez (1–4) || || 20,328 || 31–32
|-  style="text-align:center; background:#fbb;"
| 64 || June 10 || @ Red Sox || 7–3 || Lowe (10–2) || Neagle (4–3) || Wakefield (3) || 33,508 || 31–33
|-  style="text-align:center; background:#bfb;"
| 65 || June 11 || @ Red Sox || 3–1 || Jennings (8–2) || Fossum (2–1) || Jiménez (17) || 32,340 || 32–33
|-  style="text-align:center; background:#fbb;"
| 66 || June 12 || @ Red Sox || 7–5 || Castillo (5–6) || Hampton (3–8) || Urbina (19) || 31,583 || 32–34
|-  style="text-align:center; background:#fbb;"
| 67 || June 14 || Indians || 5–3 || Drese (7–4) || Thomson (6–6) || Wickman (15) || 40,156 || 32–35
|-  style="text-align:center; background:#bfb;"
| 68 || June 15 || Indians || 7–4 || Jones (1–1) || Paronto (0–2) || Jiménez (18) || 41,870 || 33–35
|-  style="text-align:center; background:#fbb;"
| 69 || June 16 || Indians || 5–4 || Colón (9–4) || Neagle (4–4) || Wickman (16) || 40,792 || 33–36
|-  style="text-align:center; background:#fbb;"
| 70 || June 18 || Yankees || 10–5 || Mussina (10–3) || Jennings (8–3) || Stanton (1) || 48,738 || 33–37
|-  style="text-align:center; background:#fbb;"
| 71 || June 19 || Yankees || 20–10 || Mendoza (4–2) || White (1–5) || || 48,821 || 33–38
|-  style="text-align:center; background:#bfb;"
| 72 || June 20 || Yankees || 14–11 (10) || Stark (4–1) || Karsay (3–3) || || 48,916 || 34–38
|-  style="text-align:center; background:#bfb;"
| 73 || June 21 || Devil Rays || 8–7 (10) || Speier (2–0) || Yan (3–3) || || 30,284 || 35–38
|-  style="text-align:center; background:#bfb;"
| 74 || June 22 || Devil Rays || 6–5 (11) || Jiménez (2–4) || Kent (0–2) || || 31,190 || 36–38
|-  style="text-align:center; background:#bfb;"
| 75 || June 23 || Devil Rays || 6–5 || White (2–5) || Kennedy (5–6) || Jiménez (19) || 31,043 || 37–38
|-  style="text-align:center; background:#bfb;"
| 76 || June 24 || @ Dodgers || 4–1 || Hampton (4–8) || Ishii (11–3) || Jiménez (20) || 34,641 || 38–38
|-  style="text-align:center; background:#fbb;"
| 77 || June 25 || @ Dodgers || 4–0 || Pérez (9–3) || Thomson (6–7) || || 23,635 || 38–39
|-  style="text-align:center; background:#fbb;"
| 78 || June 26 || @ Dodgers || 5–3 || Nomo (8–5) || Chacón (3–5) || Gagné (28) || 25,083 || 38–40
|-  style="text-align:center; background:#fbb;"
| 79 || June 27 || @ Dodgers || 7–1 || Daal (6–3) || Neagle (4–5) || || 41,279 || 38–41
|-  style="text-align:center; background:#fbb;"
| 80 || June 28 || @ Mariners || 6–2 || Piñeiro (8–3) || Jennings (8–4) || || 45,118 || 38–42
|-  style="text-align:center; background:#fbb;"
| 81 || June 29 || @ Mariners || 8–1 || García (11–5) || Hampton (4–9) || || 45,790 || 38–43
|-  style="text-align:center; background:#bfb;"
| 82 || June 30 || @ Mariners || 4–3 || Speier (3–0) || Sasaki (2–2) || Jiménez (21) || 45,928 || 39–43
|-

|-  style="text-align:center; background:#fbb;"
| 83 || July 1 || Giants || 8–6 || Rodríguez (3–4) || Jiménez (2–5) || Nen (22) || 31,115 || 39–44
|-  style="text-align:center; background:#fbb;"
| 84 || July 2 || Giants || 18–5 || Jensen (8–6) || Neagle (4–6) || || 30,838 || 39–45
|-  style="text-align:center; background:#bfb;"
| 85 || July 3 || Giants || 14–4 || Jennings (9–4) || Hernández (6–10) || || 48,504 || 40–45
|-  style="text-align:center; background:#bfb;"
| 86 || July 5 || Padres || 9–6 || Hampton (5–9) || Tomko (4–6) || Jiménez (22) || 48,540 || 41–45
|-  style="text-align:center; background:#bfb;"
| 87 || July 6 || Padres || 3–2 || Thomson (7–7) || Peavy (0–3) || Jiménez (23) || 36,866 || 42–45
|-  style="text-align:center; background:#fbb;"
| 88 || July 7 || Padres || 7–1 || Pérez (3–1) || Chacón (3–6) || || 30,707 || 42–46
|-  style="text-align:center; background:#fbb;"
| 89 || July 11 || @ Giants || 3–2 || Worrell (6–0) || Jiménez (2–6) || || 39,644 || 42–47
|-  style="text-align:center; background:#fbb;"
| 90 || July 12 || @ Giants || 9–0 || Hernández (7–10) || Hampton (5–10) || || 40,963 || 42–48
|-  style="text-align:center; background:#fbb;"
| 91 || July 13 || @ Giants || 6–1 || Schmidt (5–3) || Thomson (7–8) || || 41,434 || 42–49
|-  style="text-align:center; background:#bfb;"
| 92 || July 14 || @ Giants || 5–3 || Chacón (4–6) || Rueter (7–6) || || 41,980 || 43–49
|-  style="text-align:center; background:#bfb;"
| 93 || July 15 || @ Padres || 5–0 || Stark (5–1) || Pérez (3–2) || || 37,827 || 44–49
|-  style="text-align:center; background:#fbb;"
| 94 || July 16 || @ Padres || 5–1 || Peavy (1–3) || Jennings (9–5) || Reed (1) || 22,150 || 44–50
|-  style="text-align:center; background:#fbb;"
| 95 || July 17 || Diamondbacks || 12–3 || Schilling (16–3) || Hampton (5–11) || || 39,023 || 44–51
|-  style="text-align:center; background:#bfb;"
| 96 || July 18 || Diamondbacks || 6–4 || Speier (4–0) || Swindell (0–1) || Jiménez (24) || 35,799 || 45–51
|-  style="text-align:center; background:#bfb;"
| 97 || July 19 || Brewers || 9–5 || Chacón (5–6) || Quevedo (5–7) || || 34,347 || 46–51
|-  style="text-align:center; background:#bfb;"
| 98 || July 20 || Brewers || 6–5 || Stark (6–1) || Cabrera (4–7) || Jiménez (25) || 37,009 || 47–51
|-  style="text-align:center; background:#bfb;"
| 99 || July 21 || Brewers || 6–4 || Jennings (10–5) || Sheets (4–12) || Jiménez (26) || 31,597 || 48–51
|-  style="text-align:center; background:#fbb;"
| 100 || July 22 || @ Diamondbacks || 5–1 || Schilling (17–3) || Hampton (5–12) || || 34,516 || 48–52
|-  style="text-align:center; background:#fbb;"
| 101 || July 23 || @ Diamondbacks || 8–5 || Kim (4–1) || Jones (1–2) || || 37,837 || 48–53
|-  style="text-align:center; background:#fbb;"
| 102 || July 24 || @ Diamondbacks || 7–1 || Batista (5–7) || Chacón (5–7) || || 34,743 || 48–54
|-  style="text-align:center; background:#fbb;"
| 103 || July 26 || @ Brewers || 10–3 || Sheets (5–12) || Stark (6–2) || Vizcaíno (3) || 29,270 || 48–55
|-  style="text-align:center; background:#fbb;"
| 104 || July 27 || @ Brewers || 6–5 (10) || DeJean (1–4) || Jiménez (2–7) || || 33,497 || 48–56
|-  style="text-align:center; background:#fbb;"
| 105 || July 28 || @ Brewers || 5–3 || Wright (3–10) || Hampton (5–13) || DeJean (17) || 26,535 || 48–57
|-  style="text-align:center; background:#fbb;"
| 106 || July 30 || @ Pirates || 4–1 ||  Benson (4–5) || Neagle (4–7) || Williams (31) || 23,749 || 48–58
|-  style="text-align:center; background:#fbb;"
| 107 || July 31 || @ Pirates || 7–6 || Boehringer (3–3) || White (2–6) || Williams (32) || 18,106 || 48–59
|-

|-  style="text-align:center; background:#bfb;"
| 108 || August 1 || @ Pirates || 3–0 || Jennings (11–5) || Meadows (0–1) || Jiménez (27) || 19,075 || 49–59
|-  style="text-align:center; background:#fbb;"
| 109 || August 2 || @ Cubs || 6–4 (12) || Borowski (3–4) || Santos (0–1) || || 38,493 || 49–60
|-  style="text-align:center; background:#bfb;"
| 110 || August 3 || @ Cubs || 2–1 || Neagle (5–7) || Clement (8–8) || Jiménez (28) || 39,385 || 50–60
|-  style="text-align:center; background:#fbb;"
| 111 || August 4 || @ Cubs || 4–1 || Prior (5–3) || Chacón (5–8) || || 38,474 || 50–61
|-  style="text-align:center; background:#bfb;"
| 112 || August 6 || Reds || 7–6 || Stark (7–2) || Moehler (2–3) || Jiménez (29) || 32,780 || 51–61
|-  style="text-align:center; background:#bfb;"
| 113 || August 7 || Reds || 7–2 || Jennings (12–5) || Hamilton (3–7) || || 32,483 || 52–61
|-  style="text-align:center; background:#bfb;"
| 114 || August 8 || Reds || 10–3 || Hampton (6–13) || Haynes (12–7) || || 30,218 || 53–61
|-  style="text-align:center; background:#bfb;"
| 115 || August 9 || Cubs || 2–0 || Neagle (6–7) || Zambrano (2–3) || Jiménez (30) || 41,131 || 54–61
|-  style="text-align:center; background:#fbb;"
| 116 || August 10 || Cubs || 15–1 || Prior (6–3) || Chacón (5–9) || || 45,474 || 54–62
|-  style="text-align:center; background:#fbb;"
| 117 || August 11 || Cubs || 12–9 || Smyth (1–0) || Stark (7–3) || || 37,016 || 54–63
|-  style="text-align:center; background:#bfb;"
| 118 || August 12 || @ Marlins || 1–0 || Jennings (13–5) || Burnett (11–9) || Jiménez (31) || 5,090 || 55–63
|-  style="text-align:center; background:#bfb;"
| 119 || August 13 || @ Marlins || 5–4 || Hampton (7–13) || Núñez (5–5) || Jiménez (32) || 4,729 || 56–63
|-  style="text-align:center; background:#fbb;"
| 120 || August 14 || @ Marlins || 1–0 || Lloyd (3–3) || Santos (0–2) || || 4,746 || 56–64
|-  style="text-align:center; background:#fbb;"
| 121 || August 16 || @ Braves || 4–1 || Millwood (12–6) || Chacón (5–10) || Smoltz (43) || 30,504 || 56–65
|-  style="text-align:center; background:#bfb;"
| 122 || August 17 || @ Braves || 10–3 || Stark (8–3) || Marquis (8–7) || || 46,104 || 57–65
|-  style="text-align:center; background:#bfb;"
| 123 || August 18 || @ Braves || 6–3 || Jennings (14–5) || Maddux (11–5) || Jiménez (33) || 30,399 || 58–65
|-  style="text-align:center; background:#fbb;"
| 124 || August 19 || @ Braves || 7–6 || Smoltz (3–2) || Jiménez (2–8) || || 24,568 || 58–66
|-  style="text-align:center; background:#bfb;"
| 125 || August 20 || Expos || 8–6 || Neagle (7–7) || Vázquez (8–10) || Jiménez (34) || 28,278 || 59–66
|-  style="text-align:center; background:#fbb;"
| 126 || August 21 || Expos || 13–5 || Yoshii (4–5) || Chacón (5–11) || || 27,916 || 59–67
|-  style="text-align:center; background:#bfb;"
| 127 || August 22 || Expos || 14–6 || Stark (9–3) || Armas (8–11) || || 27,231 || 60–67
|-  style="text-align:center; background:#bfb;"
| 128 || August 23 || Mets || 10–4 || Jennings (15–5) || Astacio (11–7) || || 29,110 || 61–67
|-  style="text-align:center; background:#fbb;"
| 129 || August 24 || Mets || 5–2 || Weathers (5–3) || Jiménez (2–9) || Benítez (28) || 35,178 || 61–68
|-  style="text-align:center; background:#fbb;"
| 130 || August 25 || Mets || 7–4 || Leiter (11–10) || Neagle (7–8) || Benítez (29) || 27,386 || 61–69
|-  style="text-align:center; background:#fbb;"
| 131 || August 26 || Giants || 4–3 || Rodríguez (4–6) || Jones (1–3) || Nen (32) || 26,877 || 61–70
|-  style="text-align:center; background:#fbb;"
| 132 || August 27 || Giants || 7–4 || Rodríguez (5–6) || Jones (1–4) || Nen (33) || 26,592 || 61–71
|-  style="text-align:center; background:#fbb;"
| 133 || August 28 || Giants || 9–1 || Ortiz (9–10) || Jennings (15–6) || || 27,080 || 61–72
|-  style="text-align:center; background:#fbb;"
| 134 || August 29 || Giants || 10–6 || Hernández (9–14) || Hampton (7–14) || || 26,330 || 61–73
|-  style="text-align:center; background:#fbb;"
| 135 || August 30 || @ Padres || 2–0 || Tomko (8–8) || Neagle (7–9) || Hoffman (33) || 15,987 || 61–74
|-  style="text-align:center; background:#fbb;"
| 136 || August 31 || @ Padres || 3–0 || Condrey (1–0) || Cook (0–1) || Hoffman (34) || 31,043 || 61–75
|-

|-  style="text-align:center; background:#fbb;"
| 137 || September 1 || @ Padres || 9–5 || Nickle (1–0) || Santos (0–3) || Hoffman (35) || 21,190 || 61–76
|-  style="text-align:center; background:#bfb;"
| 138 || September 2 || @ Padres || 5–2 || Jennings (16–6) || Jones (7–8) || Jiménez (35) || 31,837 || 62–76
|-  style="text-align:center; background:#fbb;"
| 139 || September 3 || @ Giants || 4–2 || Ortiz (10–10) || Hampton (7–15) || Nen (35) || 33,483 || 62–77
|-  style="text-align:center; background:#bfb;"
| 140 || September 4 || @ Giants || 2–1 || Neagle (8–9) || Hernández (9–15) || Jiménez (36) || 34,342 || 63–77
|-  style="text-align:center; background:#bfb;"
| 141 || September 6 || Padres || 7–3 || Cook (1–1) || Eaton (0–1) || || 26,243 || 64–77
|-  style="text-align:center; background:#bfb;"
| 142 || September 7 || Padres || 5–3 || Mercker (2–0) || Holtz (2–2) || Jiménez (37) || 26,444 || 65–77
|-  style="text-align:center; background:#fbb;"
| 143 || September 8 || Padres || 9–4 || Lawrence (12–10) || Jennings (16–7) || Hoffman (36) || 25,706 || 65–78
|-  style="text-align:center; background:#fbb;"
| 144 || September 9 || @ Astros || 6–5 (10) || Lidge (1–0) || Flores (0–1) || || 28,330 || 65–79
|-  style="text-align:center; background:#fbb;"
| 145 || September 10 || @ Astros || 11–4 || Miller (13–3) || Neagle (8–10) || || 24,812 || 65–80
|-  style="text-align:center; background:#bfb;"
| 146 || September 11 || @ Astros || 8–6 || Cook (2–1) || Saarloos (6–5) || Jiménez (38) || 29,185 || 66–80
|-  style="text-align:center; background:#bfb;"
| 147 || September 12 || Dodgers || 7–1 || Stark (10–3) || Daal (11–8) || || 25,593 || 67–80
|-  style="text-align:center; background:#bfb;"
| 148 || September 13 || Dodgers || 5–4 || Mercker (3–0) || Mota (1–3) || Jiménez (39) || 26,441 || 68–80
|-  style="text-align:center; background:#fbb;"
| 149 || September 14 || Dodgers || 16–3 || Pérez (14–9) || Santos (0–4) || || 28,118 || 68–81
|-  style="text-align:center; background:#bfb;"
| 150 || September 15 || Dodgers || 5–4 || Speier (5–0) || Ashby (9–12) || Jiménez (40) || 26,011 || 69–81
|-  style="text-align:center; background:#fbb;"
| 151 || September 17 || Cardinals || 11–4 || Fassero (8–6) || Mercker (3–1) || || 25,833 || 69–82
|-  style="text-align:center; background:#fbb;"
| 152 || September 18 || Cardinals || 8–5 || White (4–6) || Speier (5–1) || Kline (6) || 25,330 || 69–83
|-  style="text-align:center; background:#fbb;"
| 153 || September 19 || Cardinals || 12–6 || Simontacchi (11–5) || Jennings (16–8) || || 25,567 || 69–84
|-  style="text-align:center; background:#bfb;"
| 154 || September 20 || Diamondbacks || 9–4 || Lowe (5–2) || Schilling (23–6) || || 37,842 || 70–84
|-  style="text-align:center; background:#bfb;"
| 155 || September 21 || Diamondbacks || 15–8 || Fuentes (1–0) || Fetters (3–2) || || 29,484 || 71–84
|-  style="text-align:center; background:#bfb;"
| 156 || September 22 || Diamondbacks || 11–7 || Fuentes (2–0) || Swindell (0–2) || || 26,520 || 72–84
|-  style="text-align:center; background:#bfb;"
| 157 || September 24 || @ Dodgers || 1–0 || Stark (11–3) || Pérez (15–10) || Jiménez (41) || 30,332 || 73–84
|-  style="text-align:center; background:#fbb;"
| 158 || September 25 || @ Dodgers || 3–2 || Gagné (3–1) || Jiménez (2–10) || || 28,189 || 73–85
|-  style="text-align:center; background:#fbb;"
| 159 || September 26 || @ Diamondbacks || 4–2 || Johnson (24–5) || Flores (0–2) || || 33,605 || 73–86
|-  style="text-align:center; background:#fbb;"
| 160 || September 27 || @ Diamondbacks || 8–6 || Batista (8–9) || Neagle (8–11) || Kim (35) || 39,693 || 73–87
|-  style="text-align:center; background:#fbb;"
| 161 || September 28 || @ Diamondbacks || 17–8 || Helling (10–12) || Lowe (5–3) || || 45,052 || 73–88
|-  style="text-align:center; background:#fbb;"
| 162 || September 29 || @ Diamondbacks || 11–8 || Patterson (2–0) || Stark (11–4) || Kim (36) || 45,553 || 73–89
|-

Player stats

Batting

Starters by position 
Note: Pos = Position; G = Games played; AB = At bats; H = Hits; Avg. = Batting average; HR = Home runs; RBI = Runs batted in

Other batters 
Note: G = Games played; AB = At bats; H = Hits; Avg. = Batting average; HR = Home runs; RBI = Runs batted in

Pitching

Starting pitchers 
Note: G = Games pitched; IP = Innings pitched; W = Wins; L = Losses; ERA = Earned run average; SO = Strikeouts

Other pitchers 
Note: G = Games pitched; IP = Innings pitched; W = Wins; L = Losses; ERA = Earned run average; SO = Strikeouts

Relief pitchers 
Note: G = Games pitched; W = Wins; L = Losses; SV = Saves; ERA = Earned run average; SO = Strikeouts

Farm system

Notes

References
2002 Colorado Rockies at Baseball Reference
2002 Colorado Rockies team page at www.baseball-almanac.com

Colorado Rockies seasons
Colorado Rockies season
Colorado Rockies
2000s in Denver